The World Food Prize is an international award recognizing the achievements of individuals who have advanced human development by improving the quality, quantity, or availability of food in the world. Conceived by Nobel Peace Prize laureate Norman Borlaug and established in 1986 through the support of General Foods, the prize is envisioned and promoted as the Nobel or the highest honors in the field of food and agriculture. It is now administered by the World Food Prize Foundation with support from numerous sponsors. Since 1987, the prize has been awarded annually to recognize contributions in any field involved in the world food supply, such as animal science, aquaculture, soil science, water conservation, nutrition, health, plant science, seed science, plant pathology, crop protection, food technology, food safety, policy, research, infrastructure, emergency relief, and poverty alleviation and hunger.

Laureates are honored and officially awarded their prize in Des Moines, Iowa, in an award ceremony held at Iowa State Capitol. Laureates are presented with a diploma, a commemorative sculpture designed by Saul Bass and a monetary award of $250,000. The Foundation also has the aim of "inspiring exceptional achievement in assuring adequate food and nutrition for all". A number of associated events and honors include the World Food Prize Symposium or the Borlaug Dialogue, the Iowa Hunger Summit and youth programs such as the Borlaug-Ruan International Internships.

History
Norman Borlaug (1914–2009) was awarded the Nobel Peace Prize in 1970 for contributions that resulted in the extensive increase in global food production. Chairperson of the Nobel Committee Aase Lionæs gave the rationale that the committee had linked providing much needed food to the world as a path for peace. Further, the increase in food production has given policy planners across the world more years in figuring out how to feed the growing population. 12 years later, Borlaug approached the Nobel Foundation to include a prize for food and agriculture. However, the Foundation was bound by Alfred Nobel's will which did not allow for the creation of such a new prize. Borlaug continued his search for a sponsor elsewhere. 

In 1986, General Foods Corporation, under Vice President A. S. Clausi's leadership, agreed to establish the prize and be the founding sponsor. The amount they agreed to, US$200,000, was equivalent to the value of the Nobel Prizes at the time. In 1990, the sponsorship was taken over by businessman and philanthropist John Ruan and his family. The Ruan family established the World Food Prize Foundation backed by an endowment of $10 million. In 2000, Kenneth M. Quinn was made the president. Borlaug, Ruan, and Quinn were all from the US state of Iowa. Barbara Stinson succeeded Quinn as the second president in 2019.

The former Des Moines Library was acquired and the Ruan family gave $5 million to renovate the building into the headquarters for the World Food Prize Foundation. A number of sponsors would go on to contribute over US$ 20 million in a campaign to transform the building into a public museum, the Hall of Laureates, to honor Borlaug and the work of the World Food Prize laureates. Other sponsors have included over 100 charitable foundations, corporations and individuals, who have helped sustain the prize and the Foundation's associated events. The Founder's Boardroom in the Hall of Laureates commemorates 27 individuals who played an important part in the foundation of the prize.

The first chairperson of the World Food Prize laureate selection committee was Norman Borlaug. Borlaug appointed the first laureate M. S. Swaminathan as his successor in 2009. Currently, Gebisa Ejeta, the 2009 laureate, is the chairperson. Apart from the chairperson who is a non-voting member, other members of the selection committee remain anonymous. 

On January 24, the Foundation announced that former Iowa Governor and U.S. Ambassador to China Terry Branstad would take over as President, replacing outgoing former president Barbara Stinson.

World Food Prize laureates

Associated events 
The Foundation has expanded into a number of associated events including the Norman E. Borlaug International Symposium, also known as the World Food Prize Symposium or the Borlaug Dialogue. A Youth Institute was established in 1994 to motivate youngsters in agriculture, food, population and connected sciences. Youth Institutes have been set up in 24 states of the United States, and three other countries. On the basis of essays, high school students are selected to take part in the activities of these institutes. Participation in these institutes also makes one eligible for an eight-week internship program.

The Borlaug-Ruan International Internship provides high school students an eight-week opportunity for a hands-on experience, working with world-renowned scientists and policy makers in the area of hunger and nutrition at leading research centres around the world. The internship was founded in 1998 and has funded over 350 Borlaug-Ruan interns who have travelled to 34 agricultural research centres around the world. The Iowa Hunger Summit has taken place during the week of the World Food Prize events since 2007. The event is open to the public and celebrates the role Iowans play in fighting hunger and advancing food security each year.

See also

 List of agriculture awards

References
Notes

Citations

Bibliography

External links
 
 
 
 

Food and drink awards
Agriculture awards
Awards established in 1986
General Foods